Freeware is software that is available for use at no monetary cost or for an optional fee, but usually (although not necessarily) closed source with one or more restricted usage rights. Freeware is in contrast to commercial software, which is typically sold for profit, but might be distributed for a business or commercial purpose in the aim to expand the marketshare of a "premium" product. Popular examples of closed-source freeware include Adobe Reader, Free Studio and Skype. This is a list of notable software packages that meet the freeware definition.

3D artistry 
 Anim8or
 Daz Studio

Administration

Remote access 
 TeamViewer

System monitoring and benchmarking 

 CPU-Z
 Mactracker
 Process Explorer
 Process Monitor
 Runscanner
 Samurize

Tweaking and configuration 
 Tweak UI
 RivaTuner

Audio tools 
Jeskola Buzz
 SoundApp
 Mp3tag
 UTAU
Audacity

Authoring (CD and DVD writing) 
 CDBurnerXP
 ImgBurn

Communications and messengers 

 ooVoo
 Skype
 Telegram
 Trillian
 Xfire
 WeChat
 Windows Live Messenger
 Yahoo! Messenger

Mobile phone 
 Disc2Phone
 MyPhoneExplorer
 Syncios

Compression 

 B1 Free Archiver
 Filzip
 LHA
 TUGZip
 ZipGenius

Decompression 
 StuffIt Expander
 Zipeg

Concept- and mind-mapping software

Data recovery 
 Recuva
 Stellar Phoenix Windows Data Recovery

Defragmentation software

Desktop plug-ins 
 AveDesk
 Kapsules
 RocketDock

Download software 

 CoreFTP
 FlashGet
 Free Studio
 WinMX
 μTorrent

Email 
 ePrompter 
 Foxmail
 Pegasus Mail

Emulators

File management 
 Xplorer² Lite

Fractal generators 
 Fractint

Games

Image manipulation 

 Artweaver
 GIMP
 Paint.NET
 Pixia

Image viewers 

 FastStone Image Viewer
 IrfanView
 Jalbum
 XnView

Information 

 GrabIt
 Lingoes
 NetNewsWire
 ProgDVB
 Xnews

Maintenance 

 Auslogics Disk Defrag
 CCleaner
 Revo Uninstaller
 Should I Remove It?
 SmartDefrag
 UltimateDefrag
 UpdateStar
 ZSoft Uninstaller

Media manipulation and creation 

 Any Video Converter
 Audiograbber
 DVD Shrink
 FormatFactory
 Free Studio
 GSpot
 VirtualDub

Media players and media centers 

 AIMP
 ALLPlayer
 foobar2000
 GOM Player
 Groove Music
 Microsoft Movies & TV
 Sonique
 Winamp
 XMPlay

Medical

Office suite

Optical disk authoring software

Optimization software

PDF and printing 

 doPDF
 Foxit Reader
 PrimoPDF
 Sumatra PDF
 PrimoPDF

Productivity 
 Evernote
 Windows Live Essentials

Programming 
 AutoIt
 HxD
 Microsoft Visual Studio Express
 RISE Editor
 Atom

Security 

 Comodo Internet Security
 HDDerase
 HijackThis
 K9 Web Protection
 Malwarebytes' Anti-Malware
 RootkitRevealer
 ZoneAlarm

Antivirus 
 Panda Cloud Antivirus
 Avast!
 AVG

Simulators 

 HNSKY

Physics 

 Algodoo

Virtual machine 
 VMware Player
 VirtualBox
 QEMU

Discontinued 
 AIDA32

Statistical packages

Text editors 

 BBEdit Lite
 Codelobster
 Programmer's File Editor
 PSPad
 TED Notepad
 TextWrangler

Typeface software

Video transcoding software

Web browsers 

 Avant Browser
 Maxthon
 Opera
 QQ browser
 SlimBrowser

Word processors

Virtual printer software

References 

Lists of software